This is a list of famous Mexican comedians.

A 
 Cristela Alonzo

B 
 Chingo Bling
 Roberto Gomez Bolaños

C 
 Cantinflas
 Capulina
 Cessy Casanova
 Roxana Castellanos
 Benito Castro
 Xavier López "Chabelo"
 Omar Chaparro

D 
 Arath de la Torre
 Maria Alicia Delgado
 Eugenio Derbez
 Consuelo Duval

E 
 Mara Escalante
 Franco Escamilla
 Felipe Esparza
 Carlos Espejel

F 
 Pablo Francisco
 Anabel Ferreira
 Franco Escamilla

H 
 Gaspar Henaine
 Shane Hilts

I 
 Gabriel Iglesias

L 
 George Lopez

O 
 Jorge Ortiz de Pinedo

P 
 Aida Pierce

R 
 Adal Ramones
 Alex Reymundo
 Guillermo Rivas
 Paul Rodriguez

S 
 María Elena Saldaña
 Freddy Soto
 Paco Stanley
 Hector Suarez
 Louis Szekely (Louis C.K.)

T 
 Sheyla Tadeo
 Victor Trujillo 
 Tin Tan

U 
 Adrian Uribe

V 
 Angélica Vale
 Germán Valdés
 Manuel Valdés
 Ramón Valdés
 María Elena Velasco
 Carlos Villagrán
 David Villalpando
 Viruta

Mexican comedians
Comedians
List